Jamundí is a town and municipality in the Department of Valle del Cauca, Colombia. 

History 
Jamundi was founded on March 23, 1536; four months before Cali, by the Spanish conquistadors Pedro de Añasco and Juan de Ampudia. The name comes from the cacique Jamundí, chief of the tribe that lived in the territory before the arrival of the Spanish.

Geography 
The municipality is characterized by a flat surface, although some mountainous terrain at the west, the "Farallones de Cali", that presents altures of 4200 meters. It's located in between the Cauca River and the "Cordillera Occidental of Colombia", also it has seven rivers: "Claro River", "Cauca", "Guachinte", "Jamundí", "Jordán", "Pital" and "Timba" and a lot of streams that flow in the town and the rural area.

Armed conflict 
Jamundí is highly affected by the Colombian armed conflict as of 2011. FARC rebels have a significant presence in the municipality and have, as of 2013, frequently attacked the police and army there. In August 2011 a large group of FARC guerrillas attacked the military, killing two soldiers from the Colombian army and wounding four more.

Tourism 
Parque De Los Cholados:  Jamundi's Cholado Park is located in a plaza close to Downtown Jamundi. This park is dedicated solely to selling a popular Colombian dessert called Cholado. Numerous vendors come here and set up shop to sell this dessert.  It is said that the Cholado was originally made in Jamundi and that the Cholados made here are made using the authentic, original recipe. Many from neighboring Cali visit Jamundi just so they can come to Cholado Park and eat authentic Cholados.  The vendors in Cholado Park also frequently sell other desserts, such as Luladas, Snow Cones, and Fruit Salads.

Centro Comercial Alfaguara: Alfaguara Shopping Mall is located in the south of the town, was opened in 1996, have 89 shops, two man-made lakes, and a hypermarket: Éxito.

Sports 
Had a football (soccer) team called Depor F.C. which plays in the Colombian second division. It is now based in the city of Cali, changing its name to Depor Aguablanca.

Gallery

References 

Municipalities of Valle del Cauca Department
Populated places established in 1536
1536 establishments in the Spanish Empire